Neocollyris formosana is a species of ground beetle in the genus Neocollyris in the family Carabidae. It was described by Bates in 1866.

References

Formosana, Neocollyris
Beetles described in 1866